This article is a list of accidents and incidents related to the International Space Station (ISS). It includes mishaps occurring onboard the ISS, flights to and from the space station, as well as other program related incidents. Excluded from the list are routine actions such as repairs of minor malfunctions or debris avoidance maneuvers.

List

2014 

 October 28: The Cygnus Orb-3 cargo spacecraft fails to orbit after its Antares rocket explodes. An uncontained failure in one of the rocket's NK-33 first stage engines caused the vehicle to collapse back on the launch pad, destroying the rocket, spacecraft, and cargo, as well as causing significant damage to the launch complex. No personnel were injured in the incident.

2015 

 June 28: The SpaceX CRS-7 Dragon cargo spacecraft fails to orbit after its Falcon 9 rocket disintegrates 139 seconds in flight. A helium COPV on the second stage had broken free of its mounting point, causing an overpressure event that burst the second stage; the Dragon spacecraft and rocket debris impacted the ocean moments later and were destroyed. An investigation traced the fault to a defective stainless steel bolt that failed at one-fifth of its design load, which SpaceX did not properly qualify for performance under cryogenic temperatures. An International Docking Adapter necessary for future American crew flights to the space station was among the cargo lost, a replacement was manufactured from spare components.

2018 

 August 29: An air leak caused by a 2 mm hole is discovered in the docked Soyuz MS-09 spacecraft. Astronauts initially patched the leak with Kapton tape, and later sealed with an epoxy patch. Russian officials accused NASA astronaut Serena Auñón-Chancellor of boring the hole, a claim described by Ars Technica as "preposterous" and "a complete fabrication".
 October 11: The Soyuz MS-10 crew mission fails to orbit after its booster disintegrates in flight. Astronauts Aleksey Ovchinin and Nick Hague are saved by the spacecraft's launch escape system, and land  downrange in Kazakhstan.

2019 

 April 20: A SpaceX Dragon crew capsule exploded during ground testing of its launch abort system. The delay injured no personnel but resulted in delays to timelines of the spacecraft's first crewed flight.
 August 23: News media report on an incident where astronaut Anne McClain is accused of illegally accessing her divorced spouse Summer Worden's bank accounts while onboard the station. The accusations were false and Worden was later indicted for lying to authorities.
 December 20: The Boeing Orbital Flight Test, an uncrewed flight test of the Boeing Starliner crew spacecraft, is successfully launched but experiences several technical issues in orbit related to an erroneously configured mission timer. The planned docking attempt to the ISS was called off and the spacecraft landed in New Mexico two days later. Boeing would conduct a repeat mission on its own funds two years later.

2021 

 July 29: The recently docked Nauka space station module experienced a computer glitch that caused it to fire its thrusters, causing the space station to be rotated end-over-end one and a half times; a "spacecraft emergency" was called for the first time in the history of the program by flight director Zebulon Scoville. Attitude control was only regained after the errant module had completely depleted its fuel reserves. The module had experienced technical issues related to its propulsion prior to docking with the ISS. The uncrewed Boe-OFT2 Starliner mission would be delayed 96 hours due to the incident, but later would be cancelled entirely after the Starliner's valves were found to be faulty.
 November 15: Russia conducts an anti-satellite missile test and shatters the Kosmos 1408 spacecraft into a cloud of thousands of debris fragments, endangering the International Space Station and other spacecraft. All crew aboard the ISS were ordered to don spacesuits and proceed to their respective return spacecraft in the event that the ISS were to be struck by debris and depressurized. In June 2022, the space station executed a maneuver to dodge a debris fragment from the destroyed satellite.

2022 

 May 19: The Boeing Orbital Flight Test 2, a repeat of a previous abortive Starliner test flight, successfully docked with the space station but not without incident. Two of the spacecraft's maneuvering thrusters failed prior to the docking, which did not end up causing any issues with the mission.

References 

 
Satellites in low Earth orbit
Populated places established in 1998
Spacecraft launched in 1998
Articles containing video clips
International science experiments
Science diplomacy
Canada–United States relations
Japan–United States relations
Russia–United States relations
Crewed spacecraft
Space stations
NASA space stations
Space program of Russia
European Space Agency programmes
Space program of Japan
Space program of Canada
Joint ventures